Gugir may refer to:
 Gugir, Fars
 Gugir-e Olya, Qazvin Province
 Gugir-e Sofla, Qazvin Province